Lakhminia railway station is a railway station in Lakhminia village in the  division of East Central Railway. Begusarai is better known as the Industrial Capital of Bihar, the birthplace of noted person Thomas Edward Ravenshaw. 851211 is village postcode.

References

External links 
 Official website of Begusarai district

Railway stations in Begusarai district
Sonpur railway division
Begusarai